Gossia floribunda or Cape ironwood species of plant in the Myrtaceae family. Found in Cape York Peninsula Australia and also in New Guinea. Small white flowers form in abundance.

References

floribunda
Flora of Queensland
Flora of New Guinea